is one of the 16 wards of the city of Nagoya in Aichi Prefecture, Japan. As of 1 October 2019, the ward has an estimated population of 90,918 and a population density of 9,693 persons per km2. The total area is 9.38 km2.

Geography
Naka Ward is located in the center of Nagoya city. Largely hemmed in by Sakura-dōri (桜通り), Ōtsu-dōri (大津通り), Fushimi-dōri (伏見通り) and Tsurumai-dōri (鶴舞通り), it contains the main shopping area of Sakae which includes a massive air-conditioned 5 square-kilometer underground mall and the 'after-five' semi-red light districts of Nishiki and Shin-sakae.

Surrounding municipalities
Chikusa Ward
Kita Ward
Higashi Ward
Nishi Ward
Nakamura Ward
Shōwa Ward
Atsuta Ward
Nakagawa Ward

History
Naka Ward was one of the original four wards of the city of Nagoya, established on April 1, 1908. On February 1, 1944, a portion of Naka Ward was divided out to become , but was merged back into Naka Ward on November 3, 1945. Most of the area was completely destroyed during the bombing of Nagoya in World War II. After the war, the layout of the streets was changed to a grid pattern, with wide streets serving as firebreaks. The city is especially proud of Sakae's 100-meter road (100メートル道路) so named because of its width. There are small parks and areas for public performances in the area between two four-lane roads that service the city centre.

Until the 1980s, town-planners were not allowed to build structures more than six stories in height outside of the business districts.

Economy
In addition the Sakae shopping area, there is also Ōsu, a sprawling old-style small-trader shopping area spreading out from the large Ōsu Kannon (大須観音), a Buddhist temple that holds flea markets. The covered streets housing numerous restaurants and stores selling fashion garments, electronics and alternative medicine give a small taste of what Japan might have been like before modernization. Between Ōsu and Sakae in Shirakawa Park are the city's Science and Modern Art museums. South of Ōsu is Kanayama Station (straddling the border with Atsuta-ku and Nakagawa-ku), Nagoya's second-most important rail transportation hub after Nagoya Station and a major access point for the Central Japan International Airport.  Many izakayas and pachinko parlors can be found in its vicinity.

Naka-ku is also home to the city's Opera House and the main government offices, including the Nagoya City Hall and the Aichi Prefectural Government Office.

When Matsuzakaya was an independent company, its headquarters were in Naka-ku.

Fushimi is the traditional commercial area.

Education
Ohkagakuen University
Tokyo University of Social Welfare

Transportation

Railroads
JR Central - Chūō Main Line
  - 
Meitetsu – Seto Line

Nagoya Municipal Subway – Higashiyama Line
  - 
Nagoya Municipal Subway – Sakura-dōri Line
  - 
Nagoya Municipal Subway – Meijō Line
  –  –  -  –  –  –  
Nagoya Municipal Subway – Tsurumai Line
 –  –  –  –

Highways
Ring Route (Nagoya Expressway)
Route 2 (Nagoya Expressway) 
Japan National Route 19 
Japan National Route 22 
Japan National Route 41 
Japan National Route 153

Notable local attractions
 Nagoya Castle
 Nagoya TV Tower
 Ōsu Kannon
 Banshō-ji
 Shōman-ji, Nagoya
 Nagoya City Science Museum
 Nagoya City Art Museum
 Electricity Museum, Nagoya
 Nagoya/Boston Museum of Fine Arts
 Hisaya Ōdori Park
 Misono-za
 Ran no Yakata
 SKE48
 Kawabun

Noted people from Naka-ku, Nagoya
Oda Nobunaga – samurai during the Sengoku period
Midori Ito – professional figure skater
Kanako Murakami - professional figure skater
Shoma Uno - professional figure skater
Hiroshi Tachi –actor, singer

References

External links

City of Nagoya website - English